The Lithuanian National Cemetery is a non-profit cemetery in Justice, Illinois, that mainly serves the Lithuanian American community in Chicago. Established in 1911, it is the resting place of many prominent Lithuanians in politics, culture, and science.

History
As the Lithuanian immigration to the United States increased, Lithuanians in Chicago established the Catholic cemetery of Saint Casimir in 1903. However, this cemetery would accept only Catholics for burials. The cemetery was controlled by Matas Kriaučiūnas, priest of St. George parish, who was suspected of embezzling parish's funds. The growing number of Lithuanian intellectuals felt the need for a non-religious Lithuanian cemetery. The idea was met with approval in February 1911 and the new cemetery was organized on 28 March 1911. The founding members were 21 different Lithuanian societies and organizations. The organizers purchased  of land. The purchase price of $10,000 was divided into bonds of $50 or $100 that were sold to Lithuanian organizations. The bonds paid 3% interest and were redeemed by 1921. The cemetery was officially opened on 30 May 1912 (the Memorial Day). The first burial was a two-year-old child reinterred from the Saint Casimir Cemetery. The cemetery was blessed by Stasys Mickevičius, founder of the Lithuanian National Catholic Church (who is buried at the cemetery). The cemetery was and still is open to all regardless of religious or political convictions. In 1934, the cemetery purchased additional 40 acres. In 1937, the cemetery added an office building (in the Art Deco style) and a columbarium for cremated remains.

The cemetery has a monument to Vincas Kudirka (he is not buried there). A traditional Lithuanian wayside shrine made of steel  in height was erected in 1995 to commemorate Soviet deportations from Lithuania in 1941–1952. Many of the headstones, particularly of those emigrants who were forced to leave due to the Soviet occupation, bear Lithuanian symbols – traditional wayside shrines and crosses, folk sashes, kanklės, Lithuanian coat of arms, Columns of Gediminas, Tower of Gediminas, etc. After Lithuania regained independence in 1990, some of the remains were returned to Lithuania. It remains the only Lithuanian cemetery in Chicago as the St. Casimir Cemetery officially dropped "Lithuanian" from its name in 1997.

Notable burials
 Juozas Adomaitis-Šernas (1859–1922), newspaper editor
 Kipras Bielinis (1883–1965), Lithuanian politician (reburied at the Petrašiūnai Cemetery in 1996)
 Vaclovas Biržiška (1884–1956), Lithuanian bibliographer
 Viktoras Biržiška (1886–1964), Lithuanian mathematician
 Kazys Bobelis (1923–2013), Lithuanian surgeon and anti-Soviet activist
 Jonas Budrys (1889–1964), Lithuanian intelligence officer, commander of the Klaipėda Revolt, consul in New York
  (1883–1969), long-term editor of Naujienos
 Kazys Grinius (1866–1950), President of Lithuania (reburied at his birthplace in 1994)
 Vladas Jakubėnas (1904–1976), Lithuanian composer
 Steponas Kairys (1879–1964), signatory of the Act of Independence of Lithuania (reburied at the Petrašiūnai Cemetery in 1996)
 Marius Katiliškis (1914–1980), Lithuanian writer
 Rapolas Skipitis (1887–1976), Lithuanian Minister of the Interior
 Jonas Šliūpas (1861–1944), Lithuanian activist (cremated in Germany; urn with ashes buried at the cemetery in 1948)
 Maurice Tillet known as The French Angel (1903–1954), French professional wrestler, buried in the same grave as his Lithuanian friend Karl Pojello (1893–1954)
 Adomas Varnas (1879–1979), Lithuanian painter

References

Cemeteries in Cook County, Illinois
Lithuanian-American culture in Chicago
1911 establishments in Illinois